McGeever is a surname. Notable people with the surname include:

 Charlie McGeever (born 1961), Irish sportsperson
 John McGeever (1939–2022), American football player
 Kitty McGeever (1966–2015), English actress and comedian
 Ryan McGeever (born 1994), Scottish footballer

See also
 McKeever